Marcel Klarenbeek (born 1 June 1960) is a retired Dutch sprinter. He competed in the 400 m and 4 × 400 m relay at the 1980 Summer Olympics, but failed to reach the finals.

References

1960 births
Living people
Athletes (track and field) at the 1980 Summer Olympics
Dutch male sprinters
Olympic athletes of the Netherlands
Athletes from Amsterdam
Universiade medalists in athletics (track and field)
Universiade silver medalists for the Netherlands
Medalists at the 1979 Summer Universiade